Khanchobany – is a national Azerbaijani dance, performed by men to fast national music.

Origination
In the 17th and 18th centuries, a tribe called the Khanchobany settled in Shirvan region of Azerbaijan. The dance named for them is performed in a tribe spirit. The dance originated in the late19th century.

Performance
The dance is performed both in weddings (mainly in village weddings) and during other holidays and concerts. It is performed only by men at a quick pace, with synchronized moves.

External links 
 Культура Азербайджана
 Видеоролик исполнения Акифом Гурбетовым музыки танца Ханчобаны
 АЗЕРБАЙДЖАНСКАЯ МУЗЫКА
 Azerbaijan dances
 AZERBAIJAN FOLK DANCES
 Video

References

Azerbaijani dances